Reverse racism, sometimes referred to as reverse discrimination, is a concept often associated with conservative social movements in the United States, which holds that affirmative action and similar color-conscious programs for redressing racial inequality are a form of anti-white racism. It reflects a belief that social and economic gains by black people cause disadvantages for white people.

Belief in reverse racism is widespread in the U.S.; however, there is little to no empirical evidence that white Americans suffer systemic discrimination. Racial and ethnic minorities generally lack the power to damage the interests of whites, who remain the dominant group in the U.S. Claims of reverse racism tend to ignore such disparities in the exercise of power and authority, which most scholars argue constitute an essential component of racism.

Allegations of reverse racism by opponents of affirmative action began to emerge in the 1970s and have formed part of a racial backlash against social gains by people of color. While the U.S. dominates the debate over the issue, the concept of reverse racism has been used internationally to some extent wherever white supremacy has diminished, such as in post-apartheid South Africa.

United States

Overview
The concept of reverse racism in the United States is commonly associated with conservative opposition to color-conscious policies aimed at addressing racial inequality, such as affirmative action. Amy E. Ansell of Emerson College identifies three main claims about reverse racism: (1) that government programs to redress racial inequality create "invisible victims" in white men; (2) that racial preferences violate the individual right of equal protection before the law; and (3) that color consciousness itself prevents moving beyond the legacy of racism. The concept of reverse racism has also been used in relation to various expressions of hostility, prejudice or discrimination toward white people by members of minority groups.

While there has been little empirical study on the subject of reverse racism, the few existing studies have found little evidence that white males, in particular, are victimized by affirmative-action programs. Linguist Mary Bucholtz argues that the concept of reverse racism, or racial reversal, "runs counter to or ignores empirically observable racial asymmetries regarding material resources and structural power". Race relations in the United States have been historically shaped by European imperialism and long-standing oppression of blacks by whites, who remain the dominant group. Such disparities in power and authority are seen by scholars as an essential component of racism; in this view, isolated examples of favoring disadvantaged people do not constitute racism.

Sociologist Ellis Cashmore writes that the terms reverse racism and reverse discrimination imply that racism is defined solely by individual beliefs and prejudices, ignoring the material relations between different groups. Sociologist Joe Feagin argues that the term reverse discrimination is an oxymoron in the context of U.S. race relations in that it obscures the "central issue of systemic racism" disadvantaging people of color. Critical race theorist David Theo Goldberg argues that the notion of reverse racism represents a denial of the historical and contemporary reality of racial discrimination.

Sociologist Karyn McKinney writes, "most claims that whites are victimized  rely on false parallels, as they ignore the power differences between whites and people of color at the group level". Anthropologist Jane H. Hill argues that charges of reverse racism tend to deny the existence of white privilege and power in society. According to sociologist Rutledge Dennis, individual members of minority groups in the United States "may be racists" toward white people, but cannot wield institutional power or shape the opportunities available to the majority as the white majority does in relation to minorities. Sociologists Matthew Desmond and Mustafa Emirbayer distinguish between institutional racism and interpersonal racism, arguing that while "members of all racial groups can harbor negative attitudes toward members of other groups", there is no "black institutional racism" or "reverse institutional racism" since people of color have not created a socially ingrained system of racial domination over white people.

History
Concerns that the advancement of African Americans might cause harm to white Americans date back as far as the Reconstruction Era in the context of debates over providing reparations for slavery. Claims of reverse racism in the early 21st century tend to rely on individual anecdotes, often based on third- or fourth-hand reports, such as of a white person losing a job to a black person.

Allegations of reverse racism emerged prominently in the 1970s, building on the racially color-blind view that any preferential treatment linked to membership in a racial group was morally wrong. Where past race-conscious policies such as Jim Crow have been used to maintain white supremacy, modern programs such as affirmative action aim to reduce racial inequality. Despite affirmative-action programs' successes in doing so, conservative opponents claimed that such programs constituted a form of anti-white racism. For example, sociologist Nathan Glazer argued in his 1975 book Affirmative Discrimination that affirmative action was a form of reverse racism violating white people's right to equal protection under the law. This view was boosted by the Supreme Court's decision in Regents of the University of California v. Bakke (1978), which said that racial quotas for minority students were discriminatory toward white people.

Public attitudes

While not empirically supported, belief in reverse racism is widespread in the United States, primarily among white people. The idea that whites have become a socially disadvantaged group has contributed to the rise of conservative social movements such as the Tea Party and support for Donald Trump. A survey in Pennsylvania in the mid-1990s found that most white respondents (80%) thought it was likely that a white worker might lose a job or a promotion to a less qualified black worker, while most black respondents (57%) thought this was unlikely. Ansell associates the idea of reverse racism with that of the "angry white male" in American politics and a backlash against government actions meant to remedy racial discrimination. Vann R. Newkirk II writes that white people's belief in reverse racism has steadily increased since the civil rights movement of the 1960s

The perception of decreasing anti-black discrimination has been correlated with white people's belief in rising anti-white discrimination. A majority (57%) of white respondents to a 2016 survey by the Public Religion Research Institute said they believed discrimination against white people was as significant a problem as discrimination against black people, while only a minority of African Americans (29%) and Hispanics (38%) agreed. Researchers at Tufts University and Harvard report that as of the early 2010s many white Americans feel as though they suffer the greatest discrimination among racial groups, despite data to the contrary. Whereas black respondents see anti-black racism as a continuing problem, white ones tend to think it has largely disappeared, to the point that they see prejudice against white people as being more prevalent. Among white respondents since the 1990s:

According to Ansell, conservatives in the U.S. believe affirmative action based on membership in a designated racial group threatens the American system of individualism and meritocracy. Psychological studies with white Americans have shown belief in anti-white racism to be linked with support for the existing racial hierarchy in the U.S. as well as the belief that success comes from "hard work".

Sociologist Eduardo Bonilla-Silva describes the "anti–affirmative action and 'reverse racism' mentality" that has become dominant since the 1980s as part of a "mean-spirited white racial animus". He argues that this results from a new dominant ideology of "color-blind racism", which treats racial inequality as a thing of the past, thereby allowing it to continue by opposing concrete efforts at reform. In a widely reprinted article, legal scholar Stanley Fish wrote that Reverse racism' is a cogent description of affirmative action only if one considers the cancer of racism to be morally and medically indistinguishable from the therapy we apply to it".

Legal challenges

Legal challenges concerning so-called "reverse racism" date back as far as the 1970s as asserted in such cases as Regents of the University of California v. Bakke; Gratz v. Bollinger; and Grutter v. Bollinger (regarding discrimination in higher education admissions) and Ricci v. DeStefano (regarding employment discrimination). The idea of reverse racism later gained widespread use in debates and legal actions concerning affirmative action in the United States. Such cases are rare; out of almost half a million complaints filed with the Equal Employment Opportunity Commission (EEOC) between 1987 and 1994, four percent were about reverse discrimination. Desmond and Emirbayer write that between 1990 and 1994, courts in the U.S. rejected all reverse discrimination cases as without merit.

South Africa

The concept of reverse racism has been used by some white South Africans concerned about "reverse apartheid" following the end of white-supremacist rule. Affirmative action in South Africa's white-dominated civil service was also met with charges of "reverse racism".

Nelson Mandela in 1995 described "racism in reverse" when black students demonstrated in favor of changing the racial makeup of staff at South African universities. Students denied Mandela's claim and argued that a great deal of ongoing actual racism persisted from apartheid.

Mixed-race South Africans have also sometimes claimed to be victimized by reverse racism of the new government. Similar accusations have been leveled by Indian and Afrikaner groups, who feel that they have not been dominant historically but now suffer from discrimination by the government.

Helen Suzman, a prominent white anti-apartheid politician, charged the African National Congress and the Mbeki administration with reverse racism since Mandela's departure in 1999.

South African critics of the "reverse racism" concept use similar arguments as those employed by Americans.

See also
 Racism in South Africa
 Racism in the United States

References

Further reading

External links

 List of cases involving allegations of reverse discrimination, U.S. Equal Employment Opportunity Commission

Conservatism
Majority–minority relations
Opposition to affirmative action
Political terminology in South Africa
Political terminology of the United States
Race in the United States